The Maritime Labor Board (MLB) was an independent US government agency with responsibilities for mediating and researching US labor law in relation to labor disputes in the maritime industry.  In 1941, its mediation function lapsed, after which it focused exclusively on research.

History

Creation

The Maritime Labor Board (MLB) was created by an amendment on June 23, 1948 (52 Stat. 968) to the Merchant Marine Act (49 Stat. 1985) of June 29, 1936.

Operations

The MLB began with two major functions.  First, it mediated labor disputes within the maritime industry. Second, it conducted research on maritime labor problems.

From its founding to June 30, 1941, the MLB became involved in 118 disputes, advised 40 disputes, and observed 37 disputes.  The Sailors' Union of the Pacific refused to deal with it at all; the National Maritime Union (NMU) would deal with it. Walter Galenson pronounced the MLB "unsuccessful" in 1960.

Devolution

On June 23, 1941, an amendment (55 Stat. 259) to the Merchant Marine Act of 1936 let the MLB's mediation functions lapse. From then on, it focused only as a research agency.

Closure

On February 14 (or 15), 1942, the MLB ceased operations due to exhaustion of appropriations.  Three days later, its files went to the National Archives.

The Conciliation Service of the National Defense Mediation Board succeeded the MLB.

On May 24, 1950, President Harry S. Truman abolished the U.S. Maritime Commission, replaced by the Maritime Administration.

Members

Board Members

In July 1938, the MLB's board included:
 Robert W. Bruere of New York (chairman)
 Dr. Louis Bloch of San Francisco (member)
 Claude E. Seehorn of Denver (member)

Staff members

From 1938 to 1940, Nathan Gregory Silvermaster was a staff member:  he ran the Silvermaster Group under Soviet spy Elizabeth Bentley.

See also

 United States Maritime Commission
 Maritime Administration
 US labor law
 National Labor Relations Board
 Federal Labor Relations Authority
 Federal Mediation and Conciliation Service (United States)
 Union organizer

References

External sources

 
 
 
 Government Accounting Office: B-9707, JUNE 7, 1940, 19 COMP. GEN. 977

History of labor relations in the United States
Labor relations boards
Government agencies established in 1938
New Deal agencies